is a Prefectural Natural Park in northeast Hyōgo Prefecture, Japan. Established in 1961, the park spans the municipalities of Asago and Toyooka.

See also
 National Parks of Japan

References

External links
  Map of Izushi-Itoi Prefectural Natural Park

Parks and gardens in Hyōgo Prefecture
Protected areas established in 1961
1961 establishments in Japan